Miko is a shrine maiden or a supplementary princess in Shinto religion

Miko may also refer to:

People
Miko (name), a given name in several cultures
Miko (surname)
DJ Miko, an Italian DJ

Other
Miko (song),  a song written by American electronic rock musician Kamtin Mohager
Miko Coffee, a brand of Belgian coffee
Miko, an alien from a 1987 film Nukie
Miko Kubota, a character from Glitch Techs
Miko Nakadai, a character from Transformers: Prime

See also
Mico (disambiguation)